The Blackfish Lake Ferry Site is a historic archaeological site in St. Francis County, Arkansas, USA. It is the only known ferry site along the route of a military road built in the 1820s and 1830s between Memphis, Tennessee, and Little Rock, Arkansas, to be used in the Trail of Tears. The ferry concession was granted to William D. Ferguson, an early settler of the area. This military road was a major route for the removal of Cherokee, Creek and Choctaw populations to the Indian Territory (present-day Oklahoma) and was also used by thousands of west-bound settlers.

The site was listed on the National Register of Historic Places in 2003.

See also
National Register of Historic Places listings in St. Francis County, Arkansas

References

Archaeological sites on the National Register of Historic Places in Arkansas
Transportation in St. Francis County, Arkansas
Trail of Tears
National Register of Historic Places in St. Francis County, Arkansas
Road transportation infrastructure on the National Register of Historic Places
Ferry terminals on the National Register of Historic Places
Ferries of Arkansas
Native American history of Arkansas